Ydrousa is a former municipality on the island of Andros, in the Cyclades, Greece. Since the 2011 local government reform it is part of the municipality Andros, of which it is a municipal unit. The population was 3,372 inhabitants at the 2011 census. It has a land area of 195.367 km² and is the largest of the three municipal units on the island of Andros, covering over half of its territory. The seat of the municipality was in Gavrio (pop. 810). The municipal unit shares the island of Ándros with the municipal units of Andros (town) and Korthio.

External links
Official website

References

Populated places in Andros